The Playwrights' Center is a non-profit theatre organization focused on both supporting playwrights and promoting new plays to production at theaters across the country. It is located in the Seward neighborhood of Minneapolis, Minnesota.  In October of 2020, the organization announced plans to move to a larger space in St. Paul.

History
The Playwrights' Center was founded in 1971 by a group of University of Minnesota undergraduate and graduate students, including Greg Almquist, Erik Brogger, Tom Dunn, Barbara Field, Gar Hildenbrand, and Jon Jackoway.  These playwrights conceived of the Playwrights' Center (initially called the Minnesota Playwriting Laboratory) as a place where writers could have the opportunity to hear their work read aloud by professional actors, to hear comments and criticism from peers and audience members, and to develop their scripts with the help of artistic collaborators and working professionals. After becoming a not-for-profit company in 1973, the founders held a series of play readings, discussion series, and one-acts performed at various venues in the Twin Cities. The focus was on a continued playwriting conversation and aiding works-in-progress. These ideals continued to be the mainstay of the center as membership expanded. In 1979, the center moved into the Olivet Lutheran Church in south Minneapolis, which remains its home today.

Jeremy Cohen serves as the producing artistic director,  and the center is further supported by a full staff, an eighteen-member board of directors and a national advisory board of theater professionals. Members of the Playwrights' Center include artists such as August Wilson, Lee Blessing, Ping Chong, Paula Vogel, and Jeffrey Hatcher, Suzan-Lori Parks, Jordan Harrison, Carlyle Brown, Craig Lucas, Melanie Marnich, and Kira Obolensky.

Recent partners have included Tectonic Theater Project, Mixed Blood Theatre, Actors Theatre of Louisville, The Public Theater (NY), Oregon Shakespeare Festival, Ten Thousand Things Theater Company, Berkeley Rep, Marin Theatre Company, Seattle Repertory Theatre, and others. The Center also collaborates with local cultural institutions as the Walker Art Center and Minnesota History Center to develop theater that deepens their programming.

Programs

The Ruth Easton Lab
The Ruth Easton New Play Series is a uniquely intimate and accessible way to experience the thrill of raw new work. It gives selected Core Writers 20 hours with collaborators to workshop their script—to write, rewrite, experiment, and shape their work. Each year a handful of plays are selected from the Core Writers for development in The Ruth Easton Series. With funding from the Ruth Easton Lab, the plays receive a director, a designer who works with the playwright on one design element of his or her work, rehearsal time, and, if the playwright chooses, a two public readings of the play which are free for everyone.

Core Writers
Each term is three years; Core Writers may re-apply for additional terms.

Core Apprentices
Schools participating in the New Plays on Campus program may nominate students to become Playwrights’ Center Core Apprentices, a unique and high-profile opportunity. In partnership with the Kennedy Center American College Theater Festival, the Core Apprentice program provides student playwrights with such benefits as a year of mentorship with a professional playwright and a full workshop of a new play at the Playwrights’ Center. Five student playwrights are selected each year to be “Core Apprentices”.

PlayLabs
PlayLabs is an annual new play festival that occurs during a two-week span in October and is the largest development event of the Playwrights' Center's season. Each playwright is paired with a director, designer, and cast of actors. The selected plays receive 30 hours of rehearsal and two readings with allocated writing and revision time. All readings are free to the public. The festival extends beyond the readings including a Jerome Fellows showcase, a panel discussion, and a festival celebration. According to The Playwrights' Center 2005 annual report, seventy four percent of Playlabs playwrights go on to receive professional productions or further development opportunities.

Fellowships

Jerome Fellowships
 The Playwrights’ Center Jerome Fellowships are awarded annually, providing emerging American playwrights with funds and services to aid them in the development of their craft. Four $16,000 fellowships will be awarded for 2015-16, in addition to $1,500 in development support. Fellows spend a year-long residency in Minnesota and have access to Playwrights' Center opportunities, including workshops with professional directors, dramaturgs, and actors.
 The Playwrights’ Center has awarded these fellowships in partnership with the Jerome Foundation since 1976. Past recipients include Lee Blessing, Lisa D’Amour, Kristoffer Diaz, Dan Dietz, Sarah Gubbins, Naomi Iizuka, Melanie Marnich, Peter Sagal, Rhiana Yazzie, Martín Zimmerman, Janet Allard, and August Wilson. The 2014-2015 Jerome Fellows are Steve Moulds, Kate Tarker, Josh Wilder, Deborah Yarchun.

Many Voices Fellowships
The Many Voices Fellowship was created in 1994 in partnership with the Jerome Foundation in order to create a home for early-career playwrights of color. Since that time, the Many Voices program has provided 140 fellowships for some 100 emerging playwrights of color, offering class instruction, play development workshops, and mentoring opportunities.

Many Voices Fellowships are awarded annually to two artists of color with previous playwriting experience and/or training. One fellowship is awarded to a Minnesota playwright, and one fellowship is awarded to either a Minnesota or national playwright. Recipients include Aamera Siddiqui, Jessica Huang, Naomi Iizuka, Daniel Alexander Jones, Aditi Kapil, Junauda Petrus, and Janaki Ranpura. Many Voices Fellowships provide:
a $10,000 stipend,
an additional $2,500 for living expenses,
$1,500 in play development funds
assistance building connections with theater leaders and companies in the Twin Cities and nationwide
Many Voices Mentorships are awarded annually to two Minnesota-based beginning playwrights of color. Mentorships focus on the nuts and bolts of playwriting through a curated package of writing and development services intended to aid the participant toward the completion of a play script. Mentorships provide a $1,000 stipend as well as free access to a number of services designed to introduce beginning playwrights to the craft of playwriting. These services include a staged reading with professional actors, two six-week classes taught by leading playwriting professionals, an array of one-night seminars, a One-on-One with a Dramaturg session, and a two-year Playwrights' Center membership.

McKnight Fellowships
McKnight Advancement Fellowships recognize playwrights whose work demonstrates exceptional artistic merit and excellence in the field, and whose primary residence is in the state of Minnesota. The grants are intended to significantly advance recipients' playwriting development and their careers.
McKnight National Residency and Commission aids in the commissioning and development of new works from nationally recognized playwrights. Past recipients include: Kia Corthron, Kate Fodor, Daniel Alexander Jones, Sibyl Kempson, Craig Lucas, Taylor Mac, Ruth Margraff, Dan O'Brien, Betty Shamieh, Kathleen Tolan, and Mac Wellman. The Residency provides artists with the following benefits:
A $14,000 commission
At least two U.S. round-trip airline tickets
Housing during the residency period
Up to $5,750 in workshop funds to support the development of the play
A public reading of the commissioned play
McKnight Theater Artist Fellowships at the Playwrights' Center recognize theater artists other than playwrights whose work demonstrates exceptional artistic merit and potential and whose primary residence is in the state of Minnesota. The $25,000 fellowships are intended to significantly advance recipients’ art and careers. Selection is based on a commitment to theater arts, evidence of professional achievement, and a sustained level of excellence in the applicant's work. Recent recipients include: Sarah Agnew, Ansa Akyea, Shá Cage, Sun Mee Chomet, James Craven, Marcus Dilliard, Kate Eifrig, Masanari Kawahara, Christopher Lutter-Gardella, Greta Oglesby, Sonja Parks, Denise Prosek, Robert Rosen, Joel Sass, Michael Wangen, and Stephen Yoakam.

References

External links
The Playwrights' Center's official website
Playwrights’ Center 2006 MPR Article on “Finding new places for plays”

Theatre in Minneapolis
Arts organizations based in Minneapolis
Arts organizations established in 1971
1971 establishments in Minnesota